is BoA's twenty-ninth Japanese single. It was released on December 9, 2009, in three formats, Limited Tales of Graces Edition, CD-only and CD+DVD.

"Mamoritai (White Wishes)" is featured as the theme song of the game Tales of Graces.

Track list

Live performances
 10/10 - Disney'S: The Basic'S　Special Live －Christmas Songs－
 12/4, 12/5, 12/8 - BoA the Live "X-mas" 2009
 12/11 - Music Fighter
 02/19/10 - Music Station

Charts
Oricon Sales Chart (Japan)

References

2009 singles
BoA songs
Tales (video game series) music
Pop ballads
2009 songs
Avex Trax singles